Apamea  (Apameia; , Afamia), on the right bank of the Orontes River, was an ancient Greek and Roman city. It was the capital of Apamene under the Macedonians, became the capital and Metropolitan Archbishopric of late Roman province Syria Secunda, again in the crusader period.

Amongst the impressive ancient remains, the site includes the Great Colonnade which ran for nearly  making it among the longest in the Roman world and the Roman Theatre, one of the largest surviving theatres of the Roman Empire with an estimated seating capacity in excess of 20,000.

History

Hellenistic era
After the conquest of the region by Alexander the Great and the subsequent wars between his generals, and according to the new interpretation of a new historical and iconographic source for Hellenistic history, a mosaic of Apamea discovered in 2011, proposed by Olszewski and Saad, the foundation of Pella, the Macedonian military camp took place in the fall 320 BC, just after the Treaty of Triparadeisos (320 BC) at the initiative of Antipater, and Cassander's inspiration. In view of this interpretation, the authors disagree with the earlier hypothesises attributing the foundation of Pella to Alexander the Great or to Antigonos I Monophtalmos. From about 300 BC Pella receive a new status of polis, was fortified and established as a city (polis) by Seleucus who named it after his Bactrian wife, Apama daughter of the Sogdian warlord Spitamenes. The site was enclosed in a loop of the Orontes which, with the lake and marshes, gave it a peninsular form whence its other name of Cherronêsos. It was located at a strategic crossroads for Eastern commerce and became one of the four cities of the Syrian tetrapolis. Seleucus also made it a military base with 500 elephants, and an equestrian stud with 30,000 mares and 300 stallions.

After 142 BC, the pretender Diodotus Tryphon made Apamea the base of his operations.

Q. Aemilius Secundus did a population survey of the city and its territory which belonged to it in AD 6, in which he counted "117,000 hom(ines) civ(ium)" – 117,000 citizen human beings, a figure that has been interpreted as giving a total population of either 130,000 or 500,000, depending on methods used.

In 64 BC, Pompey marched south from his winter quarters probably at or near Antioch and razed the fortress of Apamea when the city was annexed to the Roman Republic.<ref>Josephus 'Ant. xiv. 3. § 2</ref> In the revolt of Syria under Quintus Caecilius Bassus, it held out against Julius Caesar for three years till the arrival of Cassius in 46 BC. On the outbreak of the Jewish War, the inhabitants of Apamea spared the Jews who lived in their midst and would not suffer them to be murdered or led into captivity. Apamea was briefly captured in 40 BC by the Pompeian-Parthian forces.

Much of Apamea was destroyed in the 115 AD earthquake, but was subsequently rebuilt.

Roman era
From 218 until 234 AD, the legion II Parthica was stationed in Apamea, when it abandoned support of the usurper Macrinus to the emperor and sided with Elagabalus' rise to the purple who then defeated Macrinus in the Battle of Antioch. Apamea was destroyed by Chosroes I in the 6th century.Gibb, p. 215

During the Byzantine–Sasanian War of 602–628, the city fell in 613 to Shahrbaraz and was in Sasanian hands until near the end of the war.

Byzantine era
The Targum of Pseudo-Jonathan (Num. xxxiv. 11) has Apamea (אפמיאה) for the city name Shepham as occurring in the Targumim Jerusalem and Neofiti. Since Apamea virtually belonged to Rabbinic Palestine, the first-fruits brought by Ariston from that town were accepted for sacrifice in Jerusalem.

Islamic era
Following the Muslim conquest of Syria, Apamea was partially rebuilt and known in Arabic as Afāmiya or Fāmiya. The city was conquered by the Rashidun along with Al-Suqaylabiyah city after the battle of the Yarmuk. Apamea was then used as an observation post to warn against enemy attack.

It was settled by the Arab tribes of Bahra and Udhra. However, it only regained its importance under the rule of Aleppo-based Hamdanid dynasty. Ruled by Khalaf ibn Mula'ib from 1095–1106, the city was taken by Tancred after Khalaf's murder by Assassins.  It was destroyed by an earthquake in 1152.

 Remains 

Many remains of the ancient acropolis are still standing, consisting probably of the remains of highly decorated temples of which Sozomen speaks; it is now enclosed in ancient castle walls called Kalat el-Mudik (Kŭlat el-Mudîk); the remainder of the ancient city is to be found in the plain.

The most significant collection of objects from the site, including many significant architectural and artistic objects, that can be seen outside of Syria are in Brussels at the Cinquantenaire Museum.

As a result of the civil war in Syria, the ancient city has been damaged and looted by treasure hunters.Andrew Lawler, "Satellites track heritage loss across Syria and Iraq", Science, Year 2014, Volume 346, n° 6214, pp. 1162–1163, DOI:10.1126/science.346.6214.1162 In April 2017, Al-Masdar News published satellite photographs revealing the site was covered in hundreds of holes dug by treasure hunters seeking ancient artifacts.

 Great Colonnade 

It was rebuilt after the original, dating from the Seleucid Empire, was devastated along with the rest of Apamea in the 115 AD earthquake. Reconstruction started immediately and over the course of the second century the city was completely rebuilt, starting with the Great Colonnade. The colonnade was aligned along the north-south axis, making up the city's "cardo maximus". Starting at the city's north gate, the colonnade ran in an uninterrupted straight line to the south gate. The northern third of the colonnade's stretch is marked by a monumental votive column that stood opposite the baths. The colonnade passed through the centre of the city and several important buildings were clustered around it, including the baths, the agora, the Temple of Tyche, the nymphaeum, the rotunda, the atrium church and the basilica. On either side of the street a -wide colonnade ran its full length. They stood on square bases of 1.24 m on a side and 0.47 m high. The columns display two main designs: plain and distinctive spiral flutes. Archaeologist Jean Lassus argues that the former dates back to the Trajanic period, and the latter to that of Antoninus Pius. The colonnade's porticoes were paved with extensive mosaics along the full stretch of the colonnade.

Under the Byzantine Emperor Justinian I, several parts of the colonnade were restored. The street was narrowed to 12 m by adding a walkway on either side. Several stretches of the street had their Roman pavement replaced with a new pavement made of squared blocks of limestone. The new pavement also covered a completely overhauled drainage system. Justinian's changes included erecting a monumental tetrastylon made up of four 9 m high columns with a metre-high capitals. The city, was however, later sacked by the Sasanians under Adarmahan.

A reconstructed section of the colonnade can be seen in the Brussels Cinquantenaire Museum.

 Roman theatre 

Originally built as a Hellenistic style theatre in the early Seleucid Empire, the theatre was expanded and remodelled in the early Roman period, when the main stage and entrances were reorganized in a more typical Roman fashion. The 115 Antioch earthquake caused severe damage to the structure. It was rebuilt soon afterwards, under the patronage of both Trajan and Hadrian. The theatre was further expanded in the first half of the third century CE. Under the Byzantine Empire the theatre's drainage basin was restructured and a qanat was built through the middle of the lower stage. By the late Byzantine period the theatre had stopped serving as a centre for theatrical performances. However, the theatre and its qanat continued to be an important water source during the Byzantine and Islamic periods. The theatre was built into a steep hill overlooking the Orontes River valley.

The theatre, along with the one at Ephesus, is one of the largest surviving theatres of the Roman Empire with an estimated seating capacity in excess of 20,000. The only other known theatre that is considerably larger was the Theatre of Pompey in Rome. Much of its structure is in ruins due to architectural collapses and extensive quarrying in later epochs, and only one-eighth of the site has been exposed so far. One of the main features at the theatre is its water basin and the elaborate Roman piping system used in it. The recently excavated terracotta system is located along the eastern ground entrance and is well preserved.

Great hunting mosaic
This mosaic, now in the Cinquantenaire Museum, Brussels, was discovered in 1935 in the reception room of what was probably the palace of the Roman governor of the province of Syria Secunda. Its area is 120 m².

The great mosaic dates from 415–420 AD and is amongst the most prestigious of this type of composition. It is comparable technically and thematically with mosaics in the Palace of the Byzantine emperors in Constantinople, of the same period.

An inscription at the entrance states: "During the most beautiful Apellion, the triclinium was rebuilt in the month Gorpiaios, third indict, in the year 851" (September, 539 AD).

Bishopric
Christianity came to the area within the first century. Bishops included:
Marcellus of Apamea (fl. 375)
Alexander of Apamea (fl. 431)
Julian of Apamea, saint and opponent of Montanism
Domnus (fl. 451)
Epiphanius (451/457–after 471)
Isaac (ordained bef. 512, died c. 513/514)
Stephen (in 512–516)
Cosmas (in 512–516)
Peter of Apamea, monophysite (515/516–518/519)

Today a number of Christian denominations maintain titular sees for the town. These include  
 Latin Catholic titular Metropolitan archbishopric
 Melkite Catholic titular Metropolitan archbishopric
 Syriac Catholic Catholic titular Metropolitan archbishopric
 Maronite Catholic titular bishopric

 People
 Al-Muqtana (11th-century Ismāʿīlī Governor and a founder of the Druze Faith, the primary exponent of the Divine call and author of several of the Epistles of Wisdom.) 
 Archigenes (Greek physician)
Diodotus Tryphon,  official under King Alexander I Balas.
 Aristarchus of Thessalonica (bishop, one of the Seventy Apostles)
 Evagrius Scholasticus (6th-century historian)
 Iamblichus of Chalcis (Neo-Platonist philosopher)
 Junias (1st-century bishop)
 Numenius of Apamea (2nd century philosopher)
 Polychronius (bishop, and brother of Theodore of Mopsuestia)
 Posidonius (Greek philosopher and author, 2nd–1st Century BCE)
Pseudo-Oppian poet
 Sextus Varius Marcellus (3rd-century Roman Equestrian and later governor of Numidia. Husband of Julia Soaemias and father of Roman emperor Elagabalus)
 Theodoret (5th-century bishop)

 See also 
Qalaat al-Madiq (modern city) 
Apamea (Babylonia)
List of ancient Greek cities

 References 

 Sources and external links 

 GCatholic Latin titular see with incumbent biography links
 GCatholic Melkite titular Metropolitan see with incumbent biography links
 GCatholic Syrian Catholic titular Metropolitan see with incumbent biography links
 GCatholic Maronite titular episcopal see with incumbent biography links
 Suggestion to have Apamea recognized as a UNESCO world heritage site 
 Images by Michał Jacykiewicz
 Photos of Apamea at the American Center of Research

 Bibliography 
 Marek Titien Olszewski, Houmam Saad, "Pella-Apamée sur l'Oronte et ses héros fondateurs à la lumière d’une source historique inconnue: une mosaïque d’Apamée", in: M. P. Castiglioni, R. Carboni, M. Giuman, H. Bernier-Farella (eds.), Héros fondateurs et identités communautaires dans l’Antiquité, entre mythe, rite et politique, Morlacchi University Press, Padoue, pp. 365–416
 William Smith (editor); Dictionary of Greek and Roman Geography, "Apameia", London, (1854)
 R. F. Burton and T. Drake, Unexplored Syria E. Sachau, Reise in Syrien'', 1883.

 
Ruins in Syria
Roman Catholic dioceses in the Crusader states
Former Roman Catholic dioceses in Asia
Suppressed Roman Catholic dioceses
Former populated places in Syria
Archaeological sites in Hama Governorate